José Besprosvany (October 13, 1959) is a dancer, choreographer, director, producer and teacher, who has developed his career in Europe.  Born in 1959 in Mexico, he is a second-generation Mexican with Russian Jewish origins. He has been living and working in Brussels since 1980.

He has been noted as one of Belgium’s contemporary dance innovators and reformers.

Life
Born in 1959 in Mexico, he is a second-generation Mexican whose Russian Jewish grandparents immigrated to José's native country in the 1920s. In 1978, he left Mexico to study in France, seeking better opportunities to nurture his development in the arts field. He later moved to Belgium, where he has been living for more than 40 years. Since the early 1980s, he has been one of the reformers of Francophone Belgian contemporary dance, along with the Mossoux-Bonté Company, Pierre Droulers, Michèle Noiret, and Michèle-Anne de Mey.

José Besprosvany attended the École Jacques Lecoq in Paris, where he studied theater (mime, movement, acting, and mask play). During his studies as a dancer at the Mudra school founded by Maurice Béjart, he met the musician and teacher Fernand Schirren, who taught him that breathing and heartbeat are at the core of each word and gesture, and how bringing these two together results in rhythm. He then danced with Maurice Béjart's 20th Century Ballet for two years.

Career
In 1986, José Besprosvany founded his own company, which provides a vehicle for his constant quest to find different modes of expression, and has since resulted in a forceful and varied repertoire. His initial creations, minimalist in style, were followed by a series of productions that questioned the relationship between modern and classical languages. After this, José explored the relationships between narrative and dance.

In the late 1990s, José Besprosvany re-examined his work, which he judged to be too conformist and too close to official contemporary art forms, and began to approach performing arts from a different angle, which he continues to develop to this day, revealing a marked interest in non-Western performances, with a focus on the relationship between North and South. In recent years, his work has frequently incorporated puppetry. Besprosvany's work also shows an interest in updated versions of Ancient Greek texts, illustrating that their themes remain relevant today. He has produced several versions of the story of Prometheus, and his Oedipe and Antigone include references to current social issues.

In parallel to his passion for dance, José Besprosvany is interested in directing for both theater and cinema.

He counts among his numerous awards and distinctions: Il Coreografo Electronico (Italy) and the Bert Leysen Prijs (Belgium), as well as the Special Jury Award in Danscreen (Germany) for the dance video Andrès (1993), the Award for the Best Show of the Year in the French-speaking community of Belgium for La Princesse de Babylone (2004), and the Spectators’ Award and Prize for New Art Forms at the Rainbow Festival (Russia) for A propos de Butterfly (2007).

Scenic works
 1984: Momentum (with Emmanuelle Huynh), Brussels
 1986: Evento, Anvers
 1988: Tempéraments (with Emmanuelle Huynh), Louvain
 1989: Von heute auf morgen, Amsterdam
 1990: Apollon, la nuit, Atelier Sainte-Anne — Cabo de Buena Esperanza, for the Ballet royal de Wallonie
 1992: Dido and Æneas, for La Monnaie — Medeamaterial, for La Monnaie — Retours, Atelier Sainte-Anne
 1993: Cuarteto, Atelier Sainte-Anne — Ixtazihuatl, Charleroi
 1994: Prométhée, Atelier Sainte-Anne
 1995: Hombre alado, Namur
 1996: Lara
1996: Elles
 1996: Les Indifférents
1997: L'invisible 
 1999: Dos y dos
1999: Belle à mourir
 2002: Triptico
 2003: La Princesse de Babylone
 2004: À propos de Butterfly
 2006: 9
 2007: La Belle au bois de Dandaka
 2009: Inventions
 2010: Prométhée enchaîné
 2011: Dobles
2013: Oedipe
2015: Espejo
2017: Antigone
2019: Petrushka / The Firebird

Cinematography
Besprosvany directed the following cinematographic works that have been shown in international festivals:
 1992: Andrès
 2004: Le Dessin

References

1959 births
Living people
Mexican Jews
Mexican male dancers
Mexican people of Russian-Jewish descent
20th-century Mexican dancers
21st-century Mexican dancers